John Mark Burns (born September 21, 1979) is an American evangelical minister, televangelist and political candidate who is the pastor of the Harvest Praise & Worship Center in South Carolina. He was an early supporter of Donald Trump during the 2016 United States presidential election. Burns unsuccessfully ran for the United States House of Representatives in South Carolina's 4th congressional district in 2018 and 2022. Burns is co-founder of the NOW Television Network.

Early life and education

Burns briefly attended Southern Wesleyan University, then transferred to Tri-County Technical College, and again to North Greenville University, which he attended for one semester before dropping out.

Education claims 

Burns claimed to have held a Bachelor of Science degree from North Greenville University and claimed to have served six years in the U.S. Army Reserve. In August 2016, those claims were disproved by CNN. Burns attended North Greenville University for  one semester and did not receive a degree. Burns served from 2001 to 2005 in the South Carolina Army National Guard, rather than the Army Reserve. Burns said the false claims about his life on his website were the result of the website being hacked. Later, he admitted that he had lied about his education, but said he was attacked because he is "a black man supporting Donald Trump for president."

Career

Religious career
After working at a McDonald's, Burns founded a church in Easley, South Carolina, then moved into televangelism.

Donald Trump's 2016 presidential campaign

Burns was described by Time magazine as "Donald Trump's Top Pastor" and named one of the "16 People Who Shaped the 2016 Presidential Election" by Yahoo! News. Burns said he had usually voted Democratic, which included support for Barack Obama in the 2008 presidential election, saying, "I'm not ashamed to say that as a black man I wanted the first black man to enter the office." He later said, in 2016, he had "seen the light." Of Trump, he said "He's a smart man. He knows authenticity. I believe he knows and recognizes real character."

At a Trump rally in North Carolina, Burns said that Democratic presidential candidate Bernie Sanders, who is Jewish, "gotta get saved." Burns later addressed his statement and said he had not intended to criticize Judaism and that his remarks "had nothing to do with [Sanders'] faith or religion or conversion to Christianity."

Burns offered the benediction on the first day of the 2016 Republican National Convention. Before the prayer, he addressed the convention, called Trump a "man of God," and called on Republicans not to attack each other, labeling Hillary Clinton and the Democratic Party the "enemy." Critics of the message, including the Interfaith Alliance, accused Burns of inserting God into partisan politics. Later, he said "If I could go back and use different wording I wouldn't have said 'enemy,' I would have said, 'political opponents.'"

In August 2016, Burns was criticized after retweeting a digitally manipulated image of Hillary Clinton in blackface. Burns later stated, "I prayed that those who I offended really receive ... a sincere apology," adding that he believes that the Democratic Party uses black people for votes.

2018 U.S. House election

In February 2018, Burns announced his candidacy for South Carolina's 4th congressional district in the 2018 election. He ran for the seat Trey Gowdy, who was retiring from Congress, held since 2011. Burns lost during the first round, receiving 2.48% of the vote.

2022 U.S. House election

In 2022, Burns unsuccessfully challenged incumbent William Timmons in the Republican primary in South Carolina's 4th congressional district.

Views

2020 election 
In November 2020, during the 2020 presidential election, Burns made unsubstantiated claims of fraud. He tweeted his concern towards "those who seek to undermine the sacred election process in our democracy" and shared that "President Trump is the clear winner of this 2020 Presidential election"

Storming of the United States Capitol
After the storming of the United States Capitol in January 2021 by Trump supporters, Burns was among those who advanced the idea that people associated with Antifa were responsible for the attack.

LGBTQ people 
In a 2022 interview with conservative commentator Stew Peters, Burns called for the arrest of supportive parents of transgender children, comparing them and pro-LGBTQ teachers to the leaders of the Hitler Youth. He further called for their conviction for treason, reminding Peters that the penalty for treason is death.

Personal life 
Burns and his wife, Tomarra Burns, have three children. Burns is also the step-father to his wife's three children from a previous marriage.

References

External links
 
 Mark Burns at Ballotpedia
 Interview at YouTube.com

1979 births
Living people
21st-century evangelicals
African-American Christians
African-American people in South Carolina politics
American Christian clergy
American evangelicals
American television evangelists
Black conservatism in the United States
Candidates in the 2018 United States elections
Candidates in the 2022 United States House of Representatives elections
Christians from South Carolina
Donald Trump 2016 presidential campaign
People associated with the 2016 United States presidential election
People from Anderson, South Carolina
South Carolina Republicans